Elmina Sharks F.C. is a football club from Ghana based in Elmina, Central Region. The club is competing in the 2018 Ghanaian Premier League. Home games are played at Nduom Sports Stadium.

History
Elmina Sharks F.C. was born out of Coconut Grove Beach Resort in 1999. Elmina Sharks was formerly known as  Coconut Grove Sharks FC and the team started as division one league team. The team was in the division two league for seven years and later on moved to division one in 2011. In the 2016 season, the team won promotion to the Ghana Premier League.

Elmina Sharks played two and a half seasons in the Ghana Premier League, finishing mid-table in 2017 and failing to make the playoff stage in 2019, with the 2018 season suspended due to corruption. In both the 2019–20 season and 2020–21 season, Benjamin Bernard Boateng finished as the club's top goal scorer.

Managerial history 

 Kobina Amissah (2016–2017)
 Joachim Yaw Acheampong (2017–2021)
 Nii Lamptey (2021)
 Mallam Yahaya (2021–present)

External links
Official site

References

Football clubs in Ghana
Sports clubs in Ghana
Elmina
Elmina Sharks F.C.